The President of Transylvania University is the headmaster of the oldest university in Kentucky, founded in 1780, making it the 16th oldest university in the United States.  The President is appointed by the Board of Trustees.  The President oversees both administrative and academic standards of the university, and is responsible for facilitating student life and achievement.

List of presidents
Harry Toulmin (1794 – 1796)
James Moore (1796 – 1804)
Horace Holley (1818 – 1827)
Alva Woods (1828 – 1831)
Thomas Winthrop Coit (1835 – 1837)
Robert Davidson (1840 – 1842)
Henry Bidleman Bascom (1842 – 1849)
Lewis W. Green (1856 – 1858)
Abraham Drake (1858 – 1861)
James Kennedy Patterson (1861 – 1865)
John Bryan Bowman (1865 – 1878)
Henry White (1878 – 1880)
Charles Loos (1880 – 1897)
Reuben Cave (1897 – 1900)
Burris Jenkins (1901 – 1906)
Richard Crossfield (1908 – 1921)
Andrew Harmon (1922 – 1928)
Arthur Braden (1930 – 1938)
Raymond McLain (1939 – 1951)
Frank Rose (1951 – 1957)
Irvin Lunger (1957 – 1976)
William Kelly (1976 – 1981)
David Brown (1982 – 1983)
Charles L. Shearer (1983 – 2010)
R. Owen Williams (2010 – 2014)
Seamus Carey (2014 – 2019)
John Norton Williams (2019-2020)
 Brien Lewis (2020–Present)

References
History of the Transylvania Presidency

Transylvania
Transylvania University people